Harald Gämperle (born 11 May 1968) is a retired Swiss football defender and later manager.

References

1968 births
Living people
Sportspeople from St. Gallen (city)
Association football defenders
Swiss men's footballers
Switzerland international footballers
FC St. Gallen players
Grasshopper Club Zürich players
Neuchâtel Xamax FCS players
Swiss Super League players
Swiss football managers
FC Zürich managers
BSC Young Boys managers
Hertha BSC non-playing staff
Swiss expatriate football managers
Expatriate football managers in Germany
Swiss expatriate sportspeople in Germany
FC Zürich non-playing staff